Avelino González-Claudio (born October 8, 1942 or August 15, 1943 in Vega Baja, Puerto Rico) is a Puerto Rican independence activist who served time in a U.S. federal prison for his participation in an armored truck robbery planned by Los Macheteros. Although the robbery took place in 1983, González-Claudio was not apprehended until 25 years later, in 2008. After pleading guilty to conspiracy to commit robbery, González-Claudio was sentenced to seven years in prison in 2010. He was released three years later, in 2013.

The robbery
On September 12, 1983, a Wells Fargo armored truck in Hartford, Connecticut, was robbed of more than $7 million. The robbery, code-named "White Eagle", was "the largest cash heist in U.S. history" at the time of its commission.

Arrests
In 1985, González-Claudio was accused in absentia of having planned the robbery as a member of Los Macheteros. González-Claudio was apprehended in 2008, after more than 20 years as a fugitive and during which time he had adopted an alias that allowed him to work as a teacher in Puerto Rico. He pleaded guilty to conspiracy for robbery and, in 2010, was sentenced to seven years in prison.  Prosecutors argued for the necessity of a substantial sentence in spite of González-Claudio's age and Parkinson's disease, fearing that he could still be influential in the Los Macheteros organization, as authorities had found in February 2008 "documents in Gonzalez-Claudio's home that they say showed he was still involved with the group." Gonzalez-Claudio was released from prison on 5 February 2013.

In May 2011, his brother Norberto González-Claudio was arrested for his participation in the robbery.

See also

Oscar López Rivera
 Carlos Alberto Torres
 Juan Enrique Segarra-Palmer
 Edwin Cortes
 Pedro Albizu Campos
 Oscar Collazo
 Lolita Lebrón
 Puerto Rican independence movement

References

Living people
History of Puerto Rico
Puerto Rican nationalists
1940s births
People from Vega Baja, Puerto Rico
Puerto Rican prisoners and detainees
Imprisoned Puerto Rican independence activists
Puerto Rican independence activists
Boricua Popular Army members